Jeanville is an area in the townland of Powerstown in the barony of Gowran in County Kilkenny, Ireland. Nearby is the village of Goresbridge and country estate of Mount Loftus.

History

The name Jeanville comes from Johnville House built in the 18th century. Later it was used as the name of the bridge next to it, then also used to describe the immediate area around the house which gradually changed because of a concentration of Huguenots in the area. Johnville House still exists today but does not use the earlier name.

Johnville Bridge
The bridge still retains the original name of Johnville Bridge on all Ordnance Survey Ireland maps but is also unusual in design. This is because in close proximity to the Powerstown River, a branch tributary diverts water from the main stream closer to Johnville House before reconnecting with the Powerstown River. So the bridge is actually a set of two; one double arched bridge over the Powerstown River, and a single arched bridge over the tributary stream with the roadway being raised above the ground but still walled in on both sides. On the up-river side of the tributary there is a water filled depression known as the "watering hole" where a seasonal river joins onto the divert before flowing under the single arch section.

See also
 List of townlands in County Kilkenny

References

Townlands of County Kilkenny